Population Override is the twelfth studio album by Buckethead and his first full collaboration with keyboardist Travis Dickerson. The album is a tribute to the "great vinyl records of the '60s and '70s", with songs more often than not drifting into long jams.

The album was written after the sessions for the Cornbugs album Brain Circus, which features Buckethead, Bill "Choptop" Moseley, Pinchface and Travis Dickerson. This album was the precursor to similar collaborative efforts like Gorgone, Chicken Noodles, and Left Hanging.

The cover shows several buildings from downtown Toronto, including the Royal York Hotel and the Canada Trust Tower.

In January 2015, the label re-issued the album on vinyl format on a limited pressing of 1000 copies. The vinyl version was originally intended to feature the album by itself, but due to the length of the album, it would not be able to fit in a single LP and would be too short for 2LPs. Instead, the label tried to find outtakes from these sessions in order to fill the gap resulting from pressing the album on 2LPs, but Dickerson explained that there was no extra material left over from these sessions. Instead, the label decided to go ahead with the re-issue by filling the gap with six bonus songs, three from the album Cobra Strike and three from Funnel Weaver.

Track listing

Credits
Buckethead - electric guitar, bass guitar
Travis Dickerson - keyboards
Pinchface - drums, percussion

References

Buckethead albums
2004 albums